Pyramid 2000 is an interactive fiction game. The game is an altered version of Colossal Cave that takes advantage of an Egyptian setting, re-theming some of the locations, objects, and puzzles. For instance, the "little bird" from Adventure is now a "bird statue" and the "clam" is a "sarcophagus."

Development
The system was written by Robert Arnstein using a custom p-code machine with 32 instructions. Unlike the Infocom z-machine, this machine was specific to this game (e.g., command 13 asserted the player was carrying the emerald and only the emerald).

Reception
It was panned by 80 Micro: "This game is yet another example of Radio Shack's inability to deal with the consumer in a consumer's market... Pyramid suffers from the lack of a command word base... You can try typing HELP, but don't expect any."

References

External links
 Pyramid 2000 Solution page
 

Adventure games
1970s interactive fiction
1979 video games
TRS-80 games
TRS-80 Color Computer games
Video games developed in the United States